Sedus Stoll AG is a German company specialising in the manufacture and sale of office furniture. The Sedus Stoll head office is located in Waldshut-Tiengen, at the edge of the Black Forest.

Sedus is one of Europe’s major office furniture manufacturers, with production plants in both Dogern and Geseke, plus eight European subsidiaries in France (Paris), Italy (Cadorago), Spain (Madrid), Austria (Vienna), Great Britain (London), the Netherlands (Zoetermeer), Belgium (Erembodegem) and Switzerland (Rickenbach). A worldwide distribution network covering more than 50 countries is maintained through partner companies on all five continents.

History 

Sedus Stoll was established more than 140 years ago by Albert Stoll, and was then continued by his descendants. The last male member of the family, Christof Stoll, transferred ownership to Stoll VITA, a non profit-making foundation for the promotion of healthy diet and environmental protection. In 1995, Sedus was converted into a public limited company (Aktiengesellschaft), and in the following years, the company expanded into an all-round supplier. This included the acquisition in 1999 of a majority shareholding in the office furniture manufacturer Klöber GmbH (specialising in office seating) based in Owingen. Gesika Büromöbelwerk GmbH (specialising in break-out furniture), located in the town of Geseke, was purchased in 2002 and renamed Sedus Systems GmbH in 2008, following a merger of the Sedus and Gesika brands.

External links 
 Official Website

Furniture companies of Germany